is a subway station in Minato, Tokyo, Japan, operated by Tokyo Metropolitan Bureau of Transportation (Toei). It is adjacent to Tamachi Station on the Yamanote Line and Keihin-Tōhoku Line and is a major station for commuters due to the proximity of many office and condominium developments. It is also the closest station to the main campus of Keio University.

Despite its name, the station is not located in Mita, but in the neighboring Shiba district.

Lines
Mita Station is served by the following lines.
Toei Asakusa Line (with through services to Keikyu Main Line, Keisei Oshiage Line, Keisei Higashi-Narita Line, and Shibayama Railway Line)
Toei Mita Line (with through services to Tokyu Meguro Line)

Station layout
The station consists of two sets of platforms, for the Asakusa Line and Mita Line. The Asakusa Line is served by an island platform (platforms 1 and 2) located on the second basement ("B2F") level, while the Mita Line is served by two side platforms located on separate levels, with the southbound platform (platform 3) on the second basement ("B2F") level, and the northbound platform (platform 4) on the third basement ("B3F") level.

Platforms

History
The station opened on 21 June 1968, initially served only by the Toei Asakusa Line. The Mita Line station opened on 27 November 1973.

In popular culture
Mita station was featured in English rock band The Police's So Lonely (1980) music video.

References

External links

 Toei Mita Station 

Toei Asakusa Line
Toei Mita Line
Railway stations in Tokyo
Railway stations in Japan opened in 1968